Haicheng is a county-level city in central Liaoning Province, People's Republic of China, located about  southwest of the provincial capital Shenyang.

The infamous warlord General Zhang Zuolin was born in Haicheng.

Haicheng earthquake of 1975

On 4 February 1975, an earthquake measuring 7.3 on the Richter Scale hit the city of Haicheng, which at the time had approximately 1 million residents.  However, seismologists sent out warnings about this earthquake a day earlier and ordered evacuations.  Because of this correct prediction, many lives were saved.  This was the first successful earthquake prediction in history.  Further aiding the prediction, cats and other animals are also said to have acted strangely in the days leading up to the earthquake.  There are some questions as to the validity and accuracy of these reports, which are discussed in detail in the Haicheng Earthquake Prediction link below.

Administrative divisions
Haicheng has four subdistricts and 23 towns:

Subdistricts:
Haizhou Subdistrict
Xinghai Subdistrict
Xiangtang Subdistrict
Dongsi Subdistrict

Towns:
Gushan Manchu Town
Chagou
Jiewen
Shimu
Mafeng
Pailou
Yingluo
Bali
Maoqi
Wangshi
Nantai
Ganquan
Datun
Xiliu
Ganwang
Zhongxiao
Niuzhuang (Newchwang)
Teng'ao
Gengzhuang
Xisi
Gaotuo
Wangtai
Wenxiang

Climate

See also
Anshan
Earthquake prediction
Liaoning

References

External links
Haicheng Government Official Website
The Haicheng Earthquake & its prediction (on Internet Archive)

 
Cities in Liaoning
Anshan
County-level divisions of Liaoning